David Alan Clarke (born 3 December 1964 in Nottingham, England) is an English retired footballer who played predominantly at left back but also in midfield. Clarke began his career as an apprentice with Notts County, a club his father had appeared for in the 1960s. On 6 October 1982, he made his debut for the Magpies as a goalscoring substitute in a Football League Cup tie away to Aston Villa and went on to make 16 appearances that season in the then First Division of the Football League. He would go on to play a further four seasons for Notts County, the highlight being the 1983–84 season when he was called up for the England Youth team.

In the summer of 1987 he dropped out of the Football League to join the newly relegated Lincoln City, where he also made a goalscoring debut, this time against Stafford Rangers on 5 September 1987. He would go on to   make 30 league appearances as Lincoln secured promotion back to the league at the first attempt. He would stay at Lincoln for a further five and a half seasons before moving to Doncaster Rovers at the beginning of 1994. He remained at Doncaster for the remainder of the 1993–94 season before dropping out of the league. He made a single substitute appearance for Gainsborough Trinity at the beginning of the 1994–95 season before retiring.

External links
Lincoln City F.C. profile
Doncaster Rovers F.C. profile

1964 births
Living people
Footballers from Nottingham
English footballers
Association football defenders
Notts County F.C. players
Lincoln City F.C. players
Doncaster Rovers F.C. players
Gainsborough Trinity F.C. players